Dardanelle is an unincorporated community in Tuolumne County, California, United States. Dardanelle has a post office with ZIP code 95314, which was established in 1924. Dardanelle has a population of 35.

References

Unincorporated communities in Tuolumne County, California
Unincorporated communities in California